Shongor-e Olya (also Romanized as Shongor-e ‘Olyā; also known as Sangar-e ‘Olyā, Shagar-e Bālā, Shongor, Shongor Bālā, and Shongor-e Bālā) is a village in Kheybar Rural District, Choghamish District, Dezful County, Khuzestan Province, Iran. At the 2006 census, its population was 778, in 129 families.

References 

Populated places in Dezful County